The Tianyi Ge, translated as Tianyi Pavilion or Tianyi Chamber, is a library and garden located in Ningbo, Zhejiang Province, China. Founded in 1561 by Fan Qin during the Ming dynasty, it is the oldest existing private library in China. At its peak, it boasted a collection of 70,000 volume of antique books.

The name Tian Yi refers to the concept of cosmic unity first described in a Han dynasty commentary to the Book of Changes. In Chinese alchemy Tianyi is linked to the element of water, thus it was believed by providing a watery name would protect the library against fire damage.

The Qianlong Emperor of the Qing dynasty visited Tianyi Ge, and ordered officials to draw schematics of Tianyi Ge's building plan and book cases as prototype to build several imperial libraries including Wenyuan Ge in the Forbidden City, and Wenjin Ge in the Chengde Mountain Resort to house the Siku Quanshu encyclopedia.

After the Second Opium War, the British took many books from the libraries collection of geography and history texts. These losses were followed by further thefts by local thieves. By 1940, the collection dwindled to less than 20,000 volumes. After the founding of the People's Republic of China, due to governmental effort and donations by private collectors, the collection recovered somewhat to about 30,000 volumes, mostly rare antique Ming dynasty printed and hand copied volumes.

In 1982, Tianyi Ge was established by the Chinese authorities as a National Heritage Site. The Qin Family Drama Stage is also located in the complex.

The walls were specially constructed to prevent fire.

Background

Technical improvements in paper production 
Cheap bamboo papermaking. The bamboo paper is made from pulpy bamboo shoots (Phyllostachys aurea), a widely planted plant in China that has been a major source of papermaking fibers since the 8th century. Paper is traditionally made using natural materials, hand tools, utensils and naturally occurring reagents. This technology had further improved in the Ming Dynasty. Song Yingxing (1587–1666 AD) documented the work rolled up by the gradual process of this manufacture in his book,“Tian Gung Kai Wu (The Exploitation of the Works of Nature)”

Woodblock printing (wood engraving) 
Since the typography invention of movable type printing in the Song Dynasty of China, printing technology had continued to develop. In the late Yuan Dynasty, Wang Zhen invented wooden printing. Compared with muddy characters, the resistance of wood type to external forces was better. By the Ming dynasty, printing technology reached another peak. Chinese printers were able to produce illustrations of various colors, displaying various shades of colors and contrasting colors, imitating the hands of Chinese masters of calligraphy and painting. At the time, the artists' printers discovered and developed this technology, adding a strong color to their books

Cultural expansion and social transformation in the 15th century  
The development of urbanization that began gradually in the Song Dynasty has begun to take shape in the Ming Dynasty, and commercialization and the sprouting of capitalism also appeared in the Ming Dynasty. At the same time, the literacy rate and educational development have also been further improved during the Ming dynasty.

The increasing availability and low cost of books had promoted the popularity of literacy. The examination exam had been canceled since the Yuan Dynasty (1271–1368 AD) and had ushered in a new climax in the Ming Dynasty. The examination scale was increasing. Publishers responded to the growing number of examination candidates to print brochures. Successful model exams were popular and widely available. A wide variety of books, ranging from cheap versions of popular novels to expensive reprints of classics have a wealth of content. The novels of the Ming and Qing dynasties represented the pinnacle of Chinese classical novels. Three of the four famous novels in China were completed and widely circulated in the Ming Dynasty. From another perspective, it also illustrated the importance and prosperity of culture and books received in the Ming Dynasty. The possession of books increasingly tended to define social status. Collection books had also gained a powerful boost from publishing. As the books became cheaper, the number and scale of private libraries grew during the late Ming and early Qing dynasties. A collection of several thousand juan (bound chapters or volumes) were considered worthy of respect, and 10,000 juan (equivalent to one thousand titles) were significant. Libraries with about 30,000 juan were not uncommon. On Fan Qin's death (1585 AD), Tianyi Pavilion contained over 70 thousand juan, with several thousand titles.

Introduction

Position and the spatial distribution 

Tianyi Pavilion Historic District is located in the middle and western part of the historical street of Yuehu West Street in the old city of Ningbo. In the cultural undertakings of the feudal Chinese in the Ming Dynasty, Wen Yuan's "Tiangong Parterre" has been incorporated into Tianyi Pavilion and transformed into "East Garden" as part of the garden. Tianyi Pavilion is part of the residential area of the Fan Family and the entire area of the traditional structure of the street and the alley has disappeared. It consists of three parts: West Park, South Park and East Park.

Since 1989, the ancestral halls along the roads such as Qinjiatang, Wen's family temple, Chen family museum, and some factory buildings have been incorporated into Tianyi Pavilion and have become a showcase of traditional culture. The area of Tianyi Pavilion has reached the peak including the main body of the museum (library), the garden and the traditional architecture.

Fire prevention 
Non-combustible materials were introduced into some key building components. For instance, using clay to wrap wood structures. Non-combustible masonry could be used to create partitions between two adjacent buildings and set fire doors in certain key locations. In addition, the pool in the library could serve as a fire tank for fire protection.

Inheritance and development 
In 1676, Fan Qin's descendants passed out more than one hundred kinds of books to scholars for reading. He approved the famous scholar Huang Zongxi to go upstairs to read the Tianyige library books. Huang Zongxi became the first foreigner to enter Tianyi Pavilion. Huang Zongxi prepared a bibliography for Tianyi Pavilion and writes "Records of the collection  in Tianyi Pavilion".

Documented in the book of Huang Zongxi that:  Fan Qin divided his family  property  into two parts prior, the collection of books and other family production. The eldest son volunteered to abandon the inheritance rights of other family property, and inherited more than 70,000 volumes of books collected by his father. While the Fan's descendants maintained and supplemented the Tianyige collection, they also established ethnic rules that maintain the Tianyige collection, which stipulates that the books are shared by children and grandchildren.

Tianyi Pavilion thus increased its visibility among scholars. Since then, Tianyi Pavilion had gradually ended its external closure and is open to famous scholars, although there were not many scholars who had obtained this opportunity.

Update and preservation 

1933–1934: Tianyi Pavilion was restored and refurbished, and the front and back yards of the library were added.

1982:  Newly built a room for stacking cargo. Tianyi Pavilion experienced a new period of expansion. It is considered as a cultural heritage site that has been under national protection.

Gallery

See also
List of Chinese gardens

References

Libraries in Zhejiang
Buildings and structures in Ningbo
Major National Historical and Cultural Sites in Zhejiang
1561 establishments in China
Ming dynasty architecture
Libraries established in 1561